Sheena Bajaj (born 16 June 1992) an Indian actress known for portraying Dolly Singh in the Disney channel sitcom Best of Luck Nikki and Meher Khan in Star Plus drama Mariam Khan - Reporting Live. She has also worked in Jassi Jaissi Koi Nahi, Thapki Pyar Ki, and Khatmal E Ishq.

Personal life 
Bajaj was born on 16 June 1992 and has completed her graduation from Thakur College of Science and Commerce, Mumbai.

In 2019, she married Rohit Purohit after dating for six years. They had met on the set of television show Arjun.

Career 
Bajaj started her career as a child artists in 2003 and appeared in the films Footpath, Rakht, Kyun! Ho Gaya Na..., and Bhoot Unkle. However, her initial success as a child artist came with the portrayal of Dolly Singh in 2011 sitcom Best of Luck Nikki. She went on to star in shows like Kuch Toh Log Kahenge, Thapki Pyaar Ki, and Mariam Khan - Reporting Live.

Filmography

Films 
Yaadein (2001)
Footpath (2003)
Rakht (2004)
Kyun! Ho Gaya Na... (2004)
Kalyug (2005)
Bhoot Unkle (2006)
Fashion (2008)
Shagird (2011)
Ladies vs Ricky Bahl (2011) in a cameo appearance
Uvaa (2015) - Rashmi

Television

References

External links

Living people
Indian television actresses
Indian film actresses
21st-century Indian actresses
1992 births